Srameen is a townland near Athlone, County Westmeath, Ireland. The townland is in the civil parish of St. Mary's.

The townland stands to the south of the town, on the banks of the River Shannon which forms the border with County Roscommon.

The townland is bordered by Ballygowlan to the north and Cloonbonny to the east.

References 

Townlands of County Westmeath